Rom Di Prisco (sometimes known as Morphadron) is a Canadian composer and producer. He has provided music for over 30 video games, including Guacamelee!, Unreal Tournament 3, SSX Tricky, Spy Hunter 2, NHL series, Need for Speed series (2-5), He also produces remixes for other artists including Christopher Lawrence, Unit:187, 3kStatic, and Count Your Curses. In addition, he also works on music for films and television programs. Some of his music in film and television include Saw 2, The Oprah Winfrey Show, America's Next Top Model, and The Sopranos, among many others.

During an interview with game-ost.com, Di Prisco mentioned some of his influences: Leftfield, Skinny Puppy, The Prodigy, I Start Counting, PWEI, New Order, FSOL, Red Flag, Daft Punk, The Cure, Kraftwerk, Underworld, Thompson Twins, D.A.F., Howard Jones, and Nitzer Ebb.

In December 2010, Di Prisco released his debut solo album, Cryptidalia. The album is currently available as a choose-your-price (including free) download from his website.

In 2017, the game Fortnite was released featuring his soundtrack.

Discography

References

External links
 Official website

Living people
Canadian electronic musicians
Canadian television composers
Canadian people of Italian descent
Video game composers
Year of birth missing (living people)